Classen is a surname. Notable people with the surname include:

 Aimée Classen, American ecologist
 Andy Classen, German musician, sound engineer and record producer
 Carl Joachim Classen (1928–2013), German classical scholar
 Edmond Classen (1938–2014), Dutch actor
 Erin Classen (born 2004), Australian squash player
 Johannes Classen, German educator and classical philologist

See also
 Claasen's law (formulated by Theo A. C. M. Claasen)
 Classen School of Advanced Studies
 Klassen